Roladin or Roladin Bakery & Café is the largest bakery chain in Israel, with 78 locations around Israel.

History
The concept for Roladin was created in 1987 by two brothers Kobi and Avi Hakak. Homemade  cakes were sold from door to door, since they had no physical location.

In 1989 they opened a their first retail shop in Ramat HaSharon. Menashe Hakak, the two brothers’ father, built the counters and the shelves for the store himself. The recipes for the baked goods were from various sources including their sister-in-law, aunt  and neighbors. As the business expanded, Kobi ran the business, and Avi led new products after completing advanced confectionery courses in France and Belgium. Their brother Dudi manages overseas the different locations.

As of August 2014 Roladin had 43 locations around Israel. Some still owned by the Hakak family, while others are franchised. They have expanded considerably in the past few years, growing from 15 branches in 2005. In 2011, Roladin announced plans to add 30 suburban locations by the end of 2013.

The bakery facility is located in Kadima in the Sharon area.

Other ventures
In addition to the cafes, Roladin also provides food to El Al Airlines.

Roladin also sells packaged goods through a partnership with Tnuva.

Holidays

The Jewish holidays are some of the busiest times for Roladin. Some well known specialty products include:

Chanukah – Roladin most years wins the competition between Israeli bakeries for the best Sufganiyah. Chanukah is also Roladin's busiest time of the year.
Purim – Roladin, similar to the Sufganiyah, are usually ranked high in competitions for the best Hamantash.
Passover – During Passover, Roladin offers a wide selection of Passover desserts
Rosh HaShana – In honor of the Jewish new year, Roladin offers a wide variety of honey cakes.
Tu Bishvat – For Tu Bishvat, Roladin carries a wide selection of dried fruit and nuts.
Shavuot – During Shavuot, Roladin offers a wide range of dairy desserts including cheesecake.

See also
 Israeli cuisine
 List of restaurants in Israel

References 

Bakeries of Israel
Restaurant chains in Israel
1989 establishments in Israel